Bernard Starlight is a Native Canadian actor. He is most noted for his performance as Huey Bigstone in the film Hank Williams First Nation, for which he garnered a Genie Award nomination for Best Supporting Actor at the 26th Genie Awards, and for his regular supporting role as David "Jumbo" Tailfeathers in the television series Blackstone.

He is based in Calgary, Alberta, where he is also a stage actor.

References

External links

Canadian male film actors
Canadian male television actors
Canadian male stage actors
First Nations male actors
Male actors from Calgary
Living people
Year of birth missing (living people)